{{DISPLAYTITLE:C17H19N3}}
The molecular formula C17H19N3 (molar mass : 265.35 g/mol) may refer to:

 Acridine orange
 Antazoline
 Esmirtazapine
 Mirtazapine
 A song by Autoclav1.1

References

Chemical formulas